The Gift is the debut extended play (EP) by Guamanian recording artist Pia Mia. First released independently on December 23, 2013 as a free download by her record label Wolfpack, the EP was later reissued on iTunes on February 25, 2014, after she was signed to Interscope Records. Produced by Nic Nac Beats, The Gift is musically a pop and R&B record that is influenced by hip hop and trap music.

Perez first posted the cover of Drake's song "Hold On, We're Going Home" on her YouTube account on August 23, 2013. She later posted the songs "Shotgun Love" and "What a Girl Wants".
Two singles were released from the EP; "Red Love" was released on December 9, 2013 and "Mr. President" on May 19, 2014.

Track listings

References

External links
[ The Gift] at AllMusic

2013 debut EPs
Interscope Records EPs